Electronic invoicing (also called e-invoicing or einvoicing) is a form of electronic billing. E-invoicing methods are used by trading partners, such as customers and their suppliers, to present and monitor transactional documents between one another and ensure the terms of their trading agreements are being met. These documents include invoices, purchase orders, debit notes, credit notes, payment terms, payment instructions and, remittance slips.

E-invoicing includes a number of different technologies and entry options and is used as an umbrella term to describe any method by which an invoice is electronically presented to a customer for payment.

Purpose 
The main responsibility of the accounts payable department is to ensure all outstanding invoices from its suppliers are approved, processed, and paid. Likewise the main responsibility of the accounts receivable department is to ensure all invoices are created, delivered and subsequently paid by their vendors. Processing an invoice includes recording relevant data from the invoice and feeding it into the company’s financial or bookkeeping systems. After the feed is accomplished, the invoices must go through the company's business process to be paid.

An e-invoice can be defined as structured invoice data issued in Electronic data interchange (EDI) or XML formats, possibly using Internet-based web forms. These documents can be exchanged in a number of ways including EDI, XML, or CSV files. They can be uploaded using emails, virtual printers, web applications, or FTP sites. The company may use imaging software to capture data from PDF or paper invoices and input it into their invoicing system. This streamlines the filing process while positively impacting sustainability efforts. Some companies have their own in-house e-invoicing process; however, many companies hire a third-party company to implement and support e-invoicing processes and to archive the data on their own servers.

The variety of formats and delivery channels complicates the use of e-invoices. To simplify this, the file extension .INV could be used, which would make .INV files easily openable in accounting software. The .INV file can be in standards-compliant XML format.

History 
Since the mid-1960s, companies began establishing data links with trading partners in order to transfer documents, such as invoices and purchase orders. Inspired by the idea of a paperless office and more reliable transfer of data, they developed the first EDI systems. These proprietary systems were fairly efficient but rigid. At the time there was no standard for electronic data interchange, with nearly every set of trading partners having its own method. Recognizing this, the Accredited Standards Committee X12, a standards institution under the umbrella of ANSI, moved to standardize EDI processes. The result is known today as the ANSI X12 EDI standard.
This remained the main way to exchange transactional data between trading partners until the 1990s when companies began competing to provide more robust user interface web applications. New web-based applications had functions that catered to both the supplier and customer. They allowed for online submission of individual invoices as well as EDI file uploads, including the CSV, PDF, and XML formats. These services allow suppliers to present invoices to their customers for matching and approval in a web application. Suppliers could also see a history of all the invoices they submitted to their customers without having direct access to the customers' systems. This is because all the transactional information is stored in the data centers of the third-party company that provides the invoicing web app. This transactional information can be regulated by the customer in order to control how much information the vendor is allowed to see.

As companies advance into the digital era, more and more are switching to electronic invoicing services to automate their accounts payable departments. The 2012 Global E-Invoicing Study illustrated the rate at which electronic invoicing is growing. According to the study, 73% of respondents used electronic invoicing to some degree in 2012, a 14% increase from 2011. Supplier resistance to e-invoicing has decreased from 46% in 2011 to 26% in 2012. According to a report done by the GXS in 2013, Europe is adopting government legislation encouraging businesses to adopt electronic invoicing practices. The United States treasury estimated that implementing e-invoicing across the entire federal government would reduce costs by 50% and save $450 million annually.

e-Invoicing standards 
Various standards exist. The EU's Directive 2014/55/EU on electronic invoicing in public procurement noted that "several global, national, regional and proprietary standards exist; ... none of them prevail and most of them are not interoperable with one another".

 EDIFACT
 UBL (Universal Business Language)
 Finvoice (Finland)
 EHF (Elektronisk handelsformat) (Norway)
 E-Invoice (Estonia)
 FacturaE (Spain)
Factur-X (France)
 FatturaPA (Italy)
 CFDI (Mexico)
 ISDOC (Czech republic)
 E-faktura (Poland)
 OIOUBL (Denmark)
 PEPPOL BIS (various countries)
 Svefaktura (Sweden)
 UBL-OHNL (Netherlands)
 ZUGFeRD, XRechnung (Germany)
 Nota Fiscal Eletrônica (Brazil)
 Facturación Electrônica (Ecuador)
 DTE (Chile)

Under EU Directive 2014/55/EU on electronic invoicing in public procurement, the EU commissioned the development of a "European standard on electronic invoicing".

Usage 
To enable e-invoicing, there must be an existing method of viewing the transactions, typically an ERP (Enterprise Resource Planning) or accounting system. Routing and rules must be established in a project specification. This typically involves members of accounts payable, IT, and sometimes procurement. Once routing is established to the system, validation rules can be set up to reduce the amount of invoice exceptions. Further validation can be set up to automatically reject errors, three-way match invoices, purchase orders, and other documents. Validation can also notify suppliers of acceptance or rejections. Once the e-invoicing specification is finalized and testing is complete, the business's suppliers are connected electronically, and the e-invoicing system is ready.

Registration and login on GST e-Invoice portal 
To register on the GST e-invoice portal, you need to follow the steps below:

 Go to the GST e-invoice portal website.
 Click on the ‘Registration’ link.
 Enter your GSTIN number and click ‘Proceed’.
 Enter your business details and click ‘Submit’.
 Verify your email address and mobile number by entering the OTP sent to you.
 Create a username and password for the portal.

Government-mandated e-invoicing 
Several governments and tax administrations imposed e-invoicing formats in their respective jurisdiction for all Business-to-Business (B2B) transactions, and required that the emitted documents be stored in centralized repositories, often controlled by the tax administration. Mexico, for example, introduced the CFDI format in 2004 in the Appendix 20 of its Tax Code requiring that all invoices be stored with the Mexican Tax Administration.  Non-standard invoices were banned by law since 2012. Chile implemented a similar system in 2003,  and Colombia in 2020. 

In the European Union, France introduced mandatory government-controlled B2B e-invoicing starting July 2024. This obligation exists in Italy since 2019.

The primary goal of government-controlled e-invoicing is to reduce corporate tax fraud. Per a research paper published by the Harvard Kennedy School of Government,  Mexico’s tax-to-GDP ratio rose from 12.6% to 16.2% between 2012 and 2017, driven largely by a 48% increase in revenue from tax on goods and services after e-invoicing was made mandatory.

See also
 Electronic receipt

References 

Accounting software